"When Will I See You Again" is a 1974 song by American soul group the Three Degrees.

When Will I See You Again may also refer to:

 When Will I See You Again (Johnny Mathis album), 1975
 When Will I See You Again (Thomas Anders album), 1993
 When Will I See You Again, a 1983 album by the O'Jays

See also
 "When Can I See You Again?", a song by Owl City
 "When Can I See You", a song by Babyface